Blanchard Township is one of the fifteen townships of Putnam County, Ohio, United States.  The 2000 census found 1,232 people in the township, 1,062 of whom lived in the unincorporated portions of the township.

Geography
Located in the eastern part of the county, it borders the following townships:
Van Buren Township - north
Pleasant Township, Hancock County - northeast corner
Blanchard Township, Hancock County - east
Union Township, Hancock County - southeast corner
Riley Township - south
Pleasant Township - southwest corner
Ottawa Township - west
Liberty Township - northwest corner

The village of Gilboa is located in southeastern Blanchard Township.

Name and history
Blanchard Township was established in 1833. This township took its name from the Blanchard River. Statewide, other Blanchard Townships are located in Hancock and Hardin counties.

Government
The township is governed by a three-member board of trustees, who are elected in November of odd-numbered years to a four-year term beginning on the following January 1. Two are elected in the year after the presidential election and one is elected in the year before it. There is also an elected township fiscal officer, who serves a four-year term beginning on April 1 of the year after the election, which is held in November of the year before the presidential election. Vacancies in the fiscal officership or on the board of trustees are filled by the remaining trustees.

References

External links
County website

Townships in Putnam County, Ohio
Townships in Ohio